The Undersea Environment is a 1983 role-playing game supplement, written by J. Andrew Keith for Traveller, and published by Gamelords. The Undersea Environment is a book that details alien oceans, including factors such as pressure, gravity, temperature, decompression after dives, and undersea communication and combat. A companion adventure, The Drenslaar Quest was written by the same author.

Publication history
The Undersea Environment was written by J. Andrew Keith, with art by William H. Keith Jr., and was published in 1983 by Gamelords as a digest-sized 48-page book.

Reception
Tony Watson reviewed The Mountain Environment and The Undersea Environment together in The Space Gamer No. 72. Watson commented that "The tight focus and elaborate detail of these supplements is both their strength and weakness. Just about all aspects of mountain and undersea environments are covered, but I wonder just how much of this material is really going to make its way into the average adventure."

Reviews
 Different Worlds #36 (Sept./Oct., 1984)
Dragon #133

References

Role-playing game supplements introduced in 1983
Traveller (role-playing game) supplements